Clement J. Woltman (December 4, 1914 – January 16, 1988) was an American football tackle who played for the Philadelphia Eagles of the National Football League (NFL) for three seasons from 1938–1940.  He played high school football for South Bend Central High School in Indiana.  He played college football for Purdue where he was also a member of Sigma Pi fraternity.  He was drafted by the Eagles in the eighth round of the 1938 NFL Draft.

During World War II, Woltman volunteered with the Red Cross.

References

1914 births
1988 deaths
American football tackles
Purdue Boilermakers football players
Philadelphia Eagles players
Players of American football from South Bend, Indiana
American Red Cross personnel